The Alto de la Alianza Museum is a war museum located at the Alto de la Alianza, near Tacna, in southern Peru. It was inaugurated on May 26, 1982.

It is located on the Intiorko hill, at the base of the monument erected in honor of the combatants of the Battle of Alto de la Alianza in 1880, forming part of the Monumental Complex. The museum is circular in shape, and cannons flank it at its entrance. Inside objects from the time of the War of the Pacific are stored, such as military uniforms, rifles, sabers, dress uniforms, letters, documents, a scale model of the battle, bones, cartridges, ammunition, etc.

See also
Alto de la Alianza
List of museums in Peru

References

Museums in Peru
Museums established in 1982
War of the Pacific
History museums
Military and war museums